The 4th Arab Swimming Championships were held from 12 to 15 July 2018 in Radès, Tunisia at the Radès Olympic Pool.

Participating countries

Medal standings

Results

Men

Women

Mixed

External links 
Results

Arab Swimming Championships
Arab Swimming Championships
Arab Swimming Championships
Swimming competitions in Tunisia